Uppalaphad is a village in the Indian state of Telangana's Nalgonda district. It falls under Atmakur mandal. Uppalapahad received a model village award by president of India from Nalgonda. Repaka, Parupally, Modugubaigudem and Pothireddy pally are neighbor villages for Uppalapahad.

References

Villages in Nalgonda district